The Oak Ballroom is a historic building in Schuyler, Nebraska constructed with dozens of native oak trees hauled to the building site from the nearby Platte River using horse and buggies. It was completed in 1937 as a Works Progress Administration project. The building, designed by Nebraska architect Emiel J. Christensen, was listed on the National Register of Historic Places in 1983.

The ballroom is at the entrance to Community Park on the Mormon Trail. Native rock is used for the walls.  Chuck Hagel recalled attending dances at the ballroom and a fight at the locale.

See also
 National Register of Historic Places listings in Colfax County, Nebraska
 National Register of Historic Places listings in Nebraska

References

External links

 

Tudor Revival architecture in Nebraska
Buildings and structures completed in 1935
Event venues on the National Register of Historic Places in Nebraska
Buildings and structures in Colfax County, Nebraska
Buildings and structures completed in 1937
National Register of Historic Places in Colfax County, Nebraska